Bakri Abdelgader Babeker Muhamed (born 30 November 1987) is a Sudanese footballer who plays as a forward for Al-Ahli SC (Wad Madani), and the Sudanese national team.

On October 11, 2014, during the African Cup of Nations qualifying match, a goal from Bakri Almadina just before half-time gave Sudan a famous victory in Khartoum.

International career

International goals
Scores and results list Sudan's goal tally first.

References

Sudanese footballers
Sudan international footballers
Living people
1988 births
Al-Merrikh SC players
Association football forwards
2011 African Nations Championship players
Sudan A' international footballers
Sudanese expatriate footballers
Sudanese expatriate sportspeople in Oman
Sudanese expatriate sportspeople in Iraq
Expatriate footballers in Oman
Expatriate footballers in Iraq